Hebble may refer to

River Hebble, a river in West Yorkshire, England
Hebble Motor Services, a defunct bus company which operated in Halifax, West Yorkshire, England
Robert Hebble (born 1934), American composer
SS Hebble (1891), a British freight vessel